Opera Hall Block, also known as the Farmers State Bank and Citizens National Bank Building, is a historic opera house and commercial block located at King City, Gentry County, Missouri. It was built in 1895, and is a -story, rectangular, Romanesque Revival style brick building.  It measures 50 feet by 110 feet, and features a corner oriel window.

It was listed on the National Register of Historic Places in 2002.

References

Houses on the National Register of Historic Places in Missouri
Romanesque Revival architecture in Missouri
Commercial buildings completed in 1901
Buildings and structures in Gentry County, Missouri
National Register of Historic Places in Gentry County, Missouri